Esteban José Navarro Navarro (born 22 March 1976) is a Spanish retired footballer who played as a central midfielder, and is a current manager.

Most of his 17-year professional career was spent at Almería, where amassed Segunda División totals of 82 games and two goals (adding 71/1 in Segunda División B).

Playing career
Esteban was born in Almería, Andalusia. After beginning playing as a senior for CD Roquetas, he moved to hometown's UD Almería, being a regular starter as the team climbed up from the fourth to the second division.

Esteban played his first match as a professional on 31 August 2002, starting in a 1–2 home loss against UD Salamanca. He only scored his first goal in the second level on 27 September 2003, netting a last-minute equalizer in a 2–2 home draw to Recreativo de Huelva.

On 12 January 2006, after struggling with injuries during the season, Esteban moved to Córdoba CF from division three. After being an ever-present figure during his spell, he moved back to first club Roquetas and retired in 2010, aged 34.

Managerial career
Shortly after retiring, Esteban became assistant manager at his last club. He was appointed head coach on 17 May 2012, leaving in the following summer.

In July 2013, Esteban returned to Almería, where he worked with the youth teams. On 25 April 2018, after Fran Fernández's promotion to the first team, he was appointed manager of the reserves in the fourth tier.

On 16 October 2019, Esteban was sacked by the Rojiblancos, being replaced by Nandinho.

References

External links

1976 births
Living people
Footballers from Almería
Spanish footballers
Association football midfielders
Segunda División players
Segunda División B players
Tercera División players
UD Almería players
Córdoba CF players
Spanish football managers
Segunda División B managers
UD Almería B managers